Dunbar Park is a park located at 300 East 31st Street in the Douglas community of South Side, Chicago, Illinois.

The  site was acquired in 1962, and transformed into Dunbar Park between 1964 and 1966.

The park was named for poet Paul Laurence Dunbar.

Chicago Park District commissioned Chicago artist and sculptress Debra Hand to create a bronze statue of Dunbar in 2012.

References

External links

Dunbar Park
South Side, Chicago
1966 establishments in Illinois